Peter Foran (born 1927) was an Irish boxer. He competed in the men's welterweight event at the 1948 Summer Olympics.

References

External links
 

1927 births
Possibly living people
Irish male boxers
Olympic boxers of Ireland
Boxers at the 1948 Summer Olympics
Welterweight boxers